Sándor Záborszky (9 January 1935 – 11 March 2018) was a Hungarian swimmer. He competed in two events at the 1956 Summer Olympics.

References

External links
 

1935 births
2018 deaths
Hungarian male swimmers
Olympic swimmers of Hungary
Swimmers at the 1956 Summer Olympics
People from Kiskunhalas
Sportspeople from Bács-Kiskun County